Saint-Philippe du Roule is a station on line 9 of the Paris Métro. The station opened on 27 May 1923 with the extension of the line from Trocadéro to Saint-Augustin.  The village of Roule, which became a suburb in 1722, was a small locality called Romiliacum by Frédégaire, Crioilum by Saint Eligius, then Rolus in the 12th century.

Nearby
North of the station is the fashionable street of Rue du Faubourg Saint-Honoré and the church of Saint-Philippe du Roule. A chapel was established in the district of Bas-Roule, near a leprosarium.  It was replaced by a more important church, which was built by Jean Chalgrin between 1774 and 1784.  The church of Saint-Philippe du Roule was built in the style of a Greco-Roman basilica.  It was enlarged by Godde in 1845 and Victor Baltard in 1860. Its pediment, representing Religion and its attributes, is by François-Joseph Duret.

Station layout

Gallery

References
Roland, Gérard (2003). Stations de métro. D’Abbesses à Wagram. Éditions Bonneton.

Paris Métro stations in the 8th arrondissement of Paris
Railway stations in France opened in 1923